Hirabayashi v. United States, 320 U.S. 81 (1943), was a case in which the United States Supreme Court held that the application of curfews against members of a minority group were constitutional when the nation was at war with the country from which that group's ancestors originated. The case arose out of the issuance of Executive Order 9066 following the attack on Pearl Harbor and the U.S. entry into World War II. President Franklin D. Roosevelt had authorized military commanders to secure areas from which "any or all persons may be excluded", and Japanese Americans living in the West Coast were subject to a curfew and other restrictions before being removed to internment camps. The plaintiff, Gordon Hirabayashi, was convicted of violating the curfew and had appealed to the Supreme Court. Yasui v. United States was a companion case decided the same day. Both convictions were overturned in coram nobis proceedings in the 1980s.

Background
After the bombing of Pearl Harbor, American public opinion initially stood by the large population of Japanese Americans living on the West Coast or at least did not openly question their loyalty to the United States. Six weeks later, however, public opinion had turned against Japanese Americans, as the press and other Americans became nervous about the potential for fifth column activity. Though the administration (including President Roosevelt and FBI Director J. Edgar Hoover) dismissed rumors of Japanese American espionage on behalf of the Japanese war effort, pressure mounted upon the Administration, as the tide of public opinion turned against Japanese Americans.

On February 19, 1942, Roosevelt issued Executive Order 9066, authorizing Lieutenant General John L. DeWitt, as head of the Western Defense Command, to exclude certain persons from "military areas," regardless of their ancestry or country of citizenship. Over the course of several weeks, DeWitt issued several public proclamations that first imposed a curfew upon Japanese American citizens and resident "aliens" of Japanese descent. (The Issei, or first-generation immigrants, were prohibited from naturalized citizenship as members of an "unassimilable" race.)  Later orders confined Japanese Americans to Military Area No. 1, which included Seattle, where Hirabayashi lived. On May 3, 1942, DeWitt issued an order requiring Japanese Americans in the Seattle area to report to assigned assembly points for "evacuation" to isolated inland camps. (At the time, the terms "relocation centers," "internment camps," and "concentration camps" were used interchangeably.)

Case
The defendant, Gordon Hirabayashi, was a University of Washington student who was accused of violating the curfew and exclusion order, designated a misdemeanor by Public Law 503, a congressional statute introduced to enforce Executive Order 9066 and any subsequent military orders. Hirabayashi turned himself in for disobeying the curfew at the FBI's Seattle office on May 16, 1942 and announced that he planned to disobey the impending removal order. 

After his arrest, he was approached by an acquaintance, liberal Washington State Senator Mary Farquharson, who suggested that he make his case a test case. She organized a support committee for Hirabayashi and served as its secretary-treasurer as the committee raised funds for his legal defense.  (This support was important in advancing the case, as the ACLU refused to support Hirabayashi.)

He was held in King County Jail for five months, until his trial on October 20. The jury deliberated for just ten minutes before it returned two guilty verdicts, one for the curfew violation and another for the exclusion order, and Hirabayashi was sentenced to consecutive 30-day jail terms. (After requesting to serve his time in an outdoor labor camp rather than prison, Judge Lloyd Black handed down two 90-day sentences, to be served concurrently at the Catalina Federal Honor Camp, outside Tucson, Arizona.)

Hirabayashi's lawyers appealed the conviction, and after the Ninth Circuit Court of Appeals in San Francisco declined to rule on the case, it eventually landed in the Supreme Court.

The Justice Department expected a legal challenge to all of the three substantive elements of Roosevelt's and DeWitt's directives to Japanese Americans: curfew, exclusion, and internment. The administration, particularly the Department of Justice and Francis Biddle, sought out test cases that it could use to establish favorable precedent and prepared itself for a case that could challenge the entire internment policy.

The Supreme Court heard both the Hirabayashi case and Yasui v. United States during the 1942–43 term. It released the opinions as companion cases on June 21, 1943 and upheld the curfew order in both cases. (Although Hirabayashi had been convicted of two violations, the two sentences had been served concurrently and so the Justices chose to consider only the curfew, not the more controversial exclusion of Japanese American citizens.) Minoru Yasui was "released" to the Minidoka concentration camp on time served, and Hirabayashi, who had been living in Spokane, Washington since he had finished his sentence at Catalina, briefly remained free before he was sent to the McNeil Island Federal Penitentiary when he refused to comply with a draft order.

Later developments
This case has been largely overshadowed by Korematsu v. United States, decided the following term, in which the Court directly addressed the constitutionality of the removal of Japanese Americans from the West Coast. But, though the Korematsu case (challenging the exclusion portion of Executive Order 9066) overshadowed the Hirabayashi case (challenging only the curfew portion of the order), the Court's opinion in Korematsu cited its Hirabayashi ruling, upholding the restrictions placed on Japanese Americans.

The Hirabayashi case is notable also in that the three dissenters in Korematsu, Justices Roberts, Jackson, and Murphy had either been persuaded by fellow justices to vote with the majority or, in the case of Murphy, to concur. An article by historian Sidney Fine published in Pacific Historical Review in May 1964, "Mr. Justice Murphy and the Hirabayashi Case", pp. 195–209, shows how that Justice's initial draft opinion was a vigorous dissent, but that he eventually yielded to the arguments of his fellow Justices and issued a concurrence – which, in Fine's view, "bore a striking resemblance to the dissenting opinion he had intended to issue."  In the Korematsu decision, Murphy's dissent was vehement, calling the majority opinion "legalization of racism."

In 1986 and 1987, Hirabayashi's convictions on both charges were overturned by the U.S. District Court in Seattle and the Federal Appeals Court, because evidence arose that the Solicitor General's office (led by Charles H. Fahy) had cited examples of Japanese American sabotage in its 1943–44 Supreme Court arguments, despite having researched and debunked all the rumored incidents. In 2011, the Acting Solicitor General officially confessed error in that regard. The United States Court of Appeals for the Ninth Circuit issued the final decision as Hirabayashi v. United States in 1987.

In May 2012, President Obama posthumously awarded Gordon Hirabayashi the Presidential Medal of Freedom, America's highest civilian honor.

Eleven lawyers who had represented Fred Korematsu, Gordon Hirabayashi, and Minoru Yasui in successful efforts in lower federal courts to nullify their convictions for violating military curfew and exclusion orders sent a letter, dated January 13, 2014, to Solicitor General Donald Verrilli Jr. In light of the appeal proceedings before the U.S. Supreme in Hedges v. Obama, the lawyers asked Verrili to request the Supreme Court to overrule its 1943 decisions in Korematsu, Hirabayashi  and Yasui. If the Solicitor General shouldn't do this, they asked that the United States government "make clear" that the federal government "does not consider the internment decisions as valid precedent for governmental or military detention of individuals or groups without due process of law [...]."

See also

List of United States Supreme Court cases, volume 320
Ex parte Endo

References

External links
 
 
  Japanese Relocation (1943 Film – viewable for free at not-for profit The Internet Archive)
 Eric L. Muller, "Hirabayashi and the Invasion Evasion" North Carolina Law Review, vol. 88 (2010) pp. 1333–1389
 Materials relating to the case of Gordon K. Hirabayashi, 1943, The Bancroft Library

1943 in United States case law
United States Supreme Court cases
United States Supreme Court cases of the Stone Court
United States equal protection case law
Internment of Japanese Americans
American Civil Liberties Union litigation
20th century in Seattle
Race and law in the United States
United States racial discrimination case law